Rasul Barrage is a barrage on the River Jehlum between Jhelum District and Mandi Bahauddin District of the Punjab province of Pakistan. It is situated 72 km downstream of Mangla Dam.

New Barrage and old barrage
The current structure of the barrage was constructed in 1968 and the old barrage (built by the British) has been dismantled. The Punjab Irrigation Department's Sargodha Zone is responsible for the operation of this barrage. Rasul Barrage is used to control water flow in the River Jhelum for irrigation and flood control purposes.

Rasul Barrage has a discharge capacity of 24070 cubic meter per second. Water is diverted from this point to Chenab River at Qadirabad through Rasul-Qadirabad link canal, then ultimately transferred to Sulemanki Barrage on the Sutlej River. Rasul-Qadirabad link canal has the second largest water discharge capacity after Chashma-Jhelum link canal. It has 538-m³/s discharge capacity while Chashma-Jhelum link canal has 615-m³/s capacity. Lower Jhelum Canal, with a discharge capacity of 5280 cusecs also emanates from river Jhelum at this barrage.

This canal has culturable command area of 1.45 million acres and irrigates the districts of Mandi Bahauddin and Sargodha.

Rasul Hydel Power Station

A small hydropower plant of 22 MW (two units of 11 MW each) generation capacity was also put into operation on Upper Jhelum Canal at Rasul, Punjab in December 1952 with average annual yield of 63 units (GWh).

See also
 List of barrages and headworks in Pakistan
 List of dams and reservoirs in Pakistan
 List of power stations in Pakistan
Punjab Irrigation Department

References

Irrigation in Pakistan
Locks (water navigation)
Mandi Bahauddin District
Dams completed in 1968
Dams on the Jhelum River
Dams in Pakistan